Matti Antero Kristian Fagerholm (born 17 June 1962), better known by his stage name Michael Monroe, is a Finnish rock musician who rose to fame as the vocalist for the glam punk band Hanoi Rocks, and has served as the frontman for all-star side projects, such as Demolition 23 and
Jerusalem Slim (with Steve Stevens).

Early life 
Michael Monroe was born Matti "Makke" Fagerholm on 17 June 1962. His father, Pentti Fagerholm (1935–2015), was a very well known Finnish radio personality and reporter. Monroe states in the Hanoi Rocks autobiography All Those Wasted Years that one of the first times he was exposed to rock n' roll was when he saw Black Sabbath's 1970 Paris performance on television. Some other favourite bands of Monroe's at the time included: Alice Cooper, The New York Dolls, Led Zeppelin, Creedence Clearwater Revival, and Little Richard. From 1976 to 1979, Monroe played in a band called Madness. During this time, while rehearsing in a basement of a church in Töölö, Monroe met guitarist Andy McCoy (then known as Antti Hulkko); McCoy's band, Briard, was also rehearsing there at the time.

Later, Monroe and McCoy played together for a short time in a band called Bolin. Monroe then went on to play saxophone in Maukka Perusjätkä's band, where he also met guitarist Nasty Suicide. Monroe auditioned as a bassist for Pelle Miljoona Oy but, even though the audition went well, they chose bassist Sami Yaffa.

Career

Hanoi Rocks (1979–1985) 
Hanoi Rocks was a band that Monroe and his friend, guitarist Andy McCoy, had thought of, but because McCoy was in the Finnish punk band Pelle Miljoona Oy, he told Monroe to start the band without him. From the very first Hanoi line-up only one member (besides Monroe) remained, rhythm guitarist Nasty Suicide, who would stay in the band until 1985. Andy McCoy left Pelle Miljoona Oy and joined Hanoi Rocks in 1980. McCoy also brought bassist Sami Yaffa with him. The band later recruited drummer Gyp Casino.

The band released their first album in 1981 titled Bangkok Shocks, Saigon Shakes, Hanoi Rocks, with most of the songs written by McCoy. The album was produced by Andy McCoy and Michael Monroe, who were known as "The Muddy Twins". In 1982 Hanoi Rocks moved to London and released their second studio album Oriental Beat, which the band later dismissed as a failure, stating that the album was mixed badly by the producer Pete Woolcroft.

After the album's release, the band fired drummer Gyp Casino and hired Nicholas Dingley, better known as Razzle. This line-up, consisting of Michael Monroe, Andy McCoy, Nasty Suicide, Sami Yaffa and Razzle, has often been cited as the classic and definitive line-up. The band has said that Razzle revitalised them. Later that year, the band released Self Destruction Blues, which had Razzle on the cover, but he didn't play on the album because it was actually a compilation of old singles. The tour for the album took the band to Asia for the first time.

The next year, 1983, the band released Back to Mystery City. In 1984, the band got together with producer Bob Ezrin and started work on their fifth studio album Two Steps from the Move, which was their first recording deal to US markets. The original title of the album was "Silver Missiles and Nightingales", but this was changed before release. The album has been cited as one of the best glam rock albums, and Monroe has said that he "is very proud of it".

In 1984, Michael Monroe and Hanoi Rocks were among the most popular performers in the UK. The readers of the Sounds magazine voted Hanoi Rocks as the second best band in the world just after Marillion. The Hanoi Rocks single release "Underwater World" and the album Two Steps from the Move were voted as the fifth best single and album of the year. The televised concert which Hanoi Rocks recorded in England was voted as the second best concert video, and as stage performers, the group was voted No. 3. Michael Monroe was voted as "The Sex Symbol of the Year". Kerrang! magazine readers voted Hanoi Rocks as the ninth most important newcomer, and their album was chosen as the tenth best album of the year. The readers of Kerrang! also voted Michael Monroe the seventh sexiest performer in the music business.

While on their first large tour in the US, Monroe fractured his ankle, and some dates had to be pushed back. The band traveled to Los Angeles to spend some free time and to prepare for their two upcoming sold-out gigs. Some of the band members joined in with the members of Mötley Crüe to have a party at the home of Mötley Crüe singer Vince Neil while Monroe decided to stay in his hotel room and rest. During the party Razzle and Neil got into a car crash that resulted in Razzle losing his life.

After Razzle's death, the band performed in Helsinki, Finland, in a concert which was partly televised all over Europe as part of the 'Europa Go Go' project. The show had over 500 million viewers across Europe and it was the first public concert with their new drummer, Terry Chimes. It was also the last performance of Hanoi Rocks with Sami Yaffa who left the band due to personal differences with McCoy. The band tried to record some demos with the new members, Rene Berg and Terry Chimes, but according to Michael Monroe, things "didn't feel the same anymore", and the band disbanded after a short tour of Poland. One of the shows in Poland was recorded and later became the Rock and Roll Divorce album, released after the band had already split up.

Solo years and other projects (1985–2001) 
After Hanoi Rocks broke up in 1985, Monroe decided to start his solo career, but first he got to work with his good friend Stiv Bators. In the Fall of 1985, Bators and Monroe were asked by Steven Van Zandt to record backing vocals in London and then fly to New York to appear on his song "Sun City" and its music video. Both agreed and recorded backing vocals for the song, and both can be seen in the music video.

In December 1985, Monroe announced that he would move to New York, and in 1986, Monroe founded his first solo band. In 1987, he released his first solo album, Nights Are So Long. The album was a moderate hit, but it attracted big record labels: In 1988, Monroe signed to Mercury Records. In 1989, Monroe's second solo album was released, titled Not Fakin' It. The album featured guest appearances by Monroe's friends and fellow musicians, including Steven Van Zandt, Ian Hunter and Nasty Suicide. The album reached number 161 on the US Billboard Charts, and was Monroe's first album to be distributed internationally. The album also got good reviews from critics. Music videos were shot for the singles "Dead, Jail or Rock 'N' Roll" and "Man With No Eyes". Axl Rose appeared in the music video for "Dead, Jail or Rock 'N' Roll". At that time, Michael Monroe hosted MTV's Headbangers Ball where he introduced the new music video to the world.

When Not Fakin' It was released, the Guns N' Roses record label, UZI Suicide, was re-releasing Hanoi Rocks albums in America. Guns N' Roses guitarist Slash also made a guest appearance on Monroe's Los Angeles shows in December 1989, performing the song "Looking at You". Aerosmith's lead singer Steven Tyler had also taken notice of Monroe and asked him to perform with Aerosmith at Les Paul's 75th birthday at the Hard Rock Cafe in New York. Monroe played saxophone on the song "Big Ten Inch Record." He mostly spent the rest of 1989 and 1990 touring.

In the turn of the decade, Monroe performed along with Bryan Adams, Don Henley, Huey Lewis and Loudness in two New Year's shows at the 70,000-seat Tokyo Dome in Japan, on December 31, 1989 and January 1, 1990.

Monroe's solo career didn't prove to be as successful as he'd hoped, so in 1990 he decided to put together a new band. The band was called Jerusalem Slim, and was completed by former Billy Idol-guitarist Steve Stevens, Sami Yaffa, Greg Ellis and Ian McLagan.

In 1991, Monroe was asked by Guns N' Roses to appear on their Use Your Illusion I album, where he plays the harmonica and saxophone on the song "Bad Obsession". Monroe also later appeared on GNR's 1993 album, "The Spaghetti Incident?", where he sang on the cover of The Dead Boys' "Ain't It Fun". At the time, Monroe also joined Guns N' Roses on stage performing Honky Tonk Women together with the band members and Ronnie Wood of the Rolling Stones.

Jerusalem Slim released an album titled Jerusalem Slim but broke up in 1992, due to Monroe and Stevens' musical disagreements. Next, Monroe tried to form another band called Demolition 23. with Yaffa, Jimmy Clark and ex Star Star Guitarist Jay Hening, who was eventually replaced by Nasty Suicide. Demolition 23. did release an album, titled Demolition 23. and they toured successfully, for example, in Japan and Europe, but the band broke up after Suicide announced that he would be retiring from the music business.

During the rest of the 1990s and the early 2000s, Monroe released four more solo albums before re-forming Hanoi Rocks with Andy McCoy.

Reformation of Hanoi Rocks (2002–2009) 
In 2002, McCoy and Monroe started working together again and decided to reform Hanoi Rocks with two new members on guitar and bass, and with Michael Monroe's solo career drummer, Lacu. Hanoi Rocks released Twelve Shots on the Rocks in 2003. In 2005 Hanoi Rocks released Another Hostile Takeover replacing the two former members with Andy Christell on bass and Conny Bloom on guitar (both formerly of the Electric Boys). In 2007 the band released the album Street Poetry. In 2008 Andy McCoy and Michael Monroe stated that they had taken the band as far as they could, and so they decided to end the band. In April 2009, Hanoi Rocks played 8 sold out farewell gigs in 6 days at the Tavastia Club, in Helsinki. The band's original guitarist Nasty Suicide appeared as a special guest on 3 of the last gigs.

Ari Väntänen's, Michael Monroe's and Andy McCoys's book All Those Wasted Years was published later in 2009 in Finland, telling the story of Hanoi Rocks from the beginning to the end.

In June 2009, Monroe performed in Helsinki and in Tampere, on Sauna Open Air -festival with Duff McKagans Loaded band. On 3 July 2009, Monroe also performed in Finland, at the Ruisrock -festival with Ginger's band, The Wildhearts. At the end of July, Monroe also shared the stage for the first time in many years with Sami Yaffa when his band, the New York Dolls, were performing in Helsinki. After these performances with Yaffa and Ginger, Monroe and Yaffa started discussing the possibility of working together again. In December 2009, Monroe met Ginger again while he was playing in Alice Cooper's band. Monroe joined Alice Cooper on stage at Cooper's concert in Espoo, Finland, to play "School's Out". After the show, Ginger and Monroe discussed the possibilities of working together, and soon afterwards, Monroe, Ginger and Yaffa decided to line up a band together.

New band (2010–present) 
On 25 January 2010 Michael Monroe held a press conference in Los Angeles, where he unveiled his new band featuring Sami Yaffa on bass, guitarist Ginger from The Wildhearts, Todd Youth from Danzig and Samhain on a second guitar, and Jimmy Clarke on drums. The press conference was hosted by Bam Margera of Jackass. The Michael Monroe band started touring on 11 March at San Francisco's Paradise Lounge and toured the US until 21 March. After some of the first shows Todd Youth and Jimmy Clark were replaced by guitarist Steve Conte of New York Dolls and drummer Karl Rosqvist.

During the summer of 2010 Michael Monroe band played a number of festival gigs all over the world, including Helsinki Live in Finland together with Guns N' Roses, the Sweden Rock Festival and the Download Festival in England. The band also performed at Ruisrock festival in Turku, Finland, where Slash was also performing. Monroe joined Slash on stage for a performance of "We're All Gonna Die" (from Slash's solo album) and "Up Around the Bend." At the Ankkarock festival in Finland, Steve Conte couldn't perform and he was replaced for this one show with the ex-Hanoi Rocks guitarist, Nasty Suicide. Since the early 1990s and the Demolition 23 tour this was the first time of these three members of the original Hanoi Rocks to perform on the stage together. Michael Monroe also performed on Summer Sonic festivals in Tokyo and Osaka, where Slash was also performing. The two got together again sharing a stage for a couple of songs. During the performance of the song "We're All Gonna Die" Monroe broke two of his ribs while hitting a metal barrel in front of the stage.

On 28 June 2010, it was announced that the Michael Monroe band would be supporting Motörhead on their 35th anniversary UK tour.

The first album of Michael Monroe's new band, the live album Another Night in the Sun was released in September 2010. The album was recorded at the Tavastia Club in Helsinki, Finland and mixed in Los Angeles by Niko Bolas (Keith Richards, Kiss, Spinal Tap). The album was mastered by Grammy winner Richard Dodd, who had worked with Tom Petty and The Dixie Chicks.

In September 2010, the band went into a studio to record their first studio album, Sensory Overdrive. The album was recorded in Los Angeles and it was produced by producer Jack Douglas (Aerosmith, John Lennon). The first single, "78", was released in January and the album was set for release on 14 March 2011. The band had also booked an extensive UK tour for April 2010, taking in venues in London, Brighton, Birmingham, Leeds and Exeter among others. In September 2010, Monroe signed a recording deal with Spinefarm Records / Universal Music, to distribute Monroe's upcoming albums.

On 9 November 2011, Sensory Overdrive won the "Album of the Year" award at the 2011 Classic Rock magazine awards.

In fall 2012, Michael Monroe announced that the band would be back in the studio recording a new album to be released in 2013. By July Steven Van Zandt played the well-received lead single, "Ballad of the Lower East Side", on his radio show almost weekly. On 23 August 2013 the band released Horns & Halos, which went straight to number 1 in the Finnish album charts and was certified Gold in four days in Finland.

On 6 March 2014, it was announced that guitarist Dregen was leaving the band to focus on his solo career. He would be replaced by former Black Halos, Amen and Ginger Wildheart guitarist Rich Jones

Personal life 
Unlike other members of Hanoi Rocks in the 1980s, Monroe was never a big drug user or a big drinker although in the band's book All Those Wasted Years, Monroe tells about being addicted for a short while to amphetamine and heroin in the 1980s while living in London, and to amphetamine between 2000 and 2002 after his first wife died.

During his years in music business, Michael Monroe has established a close friendship with many music business icons including the late Stiv Bators and Johnny Thunders – both idols of Monroe's, Steven Van Zandt who produced Monroe's album with Demolition 23, Deborah Harry, Axl Rose, Slash, Duff McKagan and Alice Cooper.

Michael Monroe and Hanoi Rocks have influenced many rock'n'roll artists and bands: Slash had bought tickets to the sold-out gigs in Los Angeles which were cancelled because of the death of Razzle. Vince Neil and Nikki Sixx of Mötley Crüe and bands like Guns N' Roses have said in public that they were all inspired by Hanoi Rocks. In the Hanoi Rocks autobiography All Those Wasted Years, Foo Fighters guitarist Chris Shiflett says "The Hollywood scene changed in just one night after people saw the pictures of Hanoi Rocks. After that everyone was wearing the same kind of hair, clothes and make up as Monroe." Michael Monroe and Hanoi Rocks have often been mentioned as the founding fathers of the Hollywood's glam-rock scene, which was then adopted and developed by many 1980s glam-, punk-, and hard rock bands like Mötley Crüe, Jetboy, LA Guns and Poison.

Monroe met his first wife Jude Wilder in 1985 while she was working at CBS for Hanoi Rocks' Two Steps From The Move project. After they married in 1989, the couple moved to Los Angeles and then to New York. Later on the couple moved to Turku, a city in Finland, where Monroe relocated after many years in the United States. Wilder died of intracranial hemorrhage on 19 June 2001. Michael Monroe married his current wife, Johanna, on 3 July 2003.

Discography 
Solo albums 
Nights Are So Long (1987)
Not Fakin' It (1989)
Peace of Mind (1996)
Life Gets You Dirty (1999)
Take Them and Break Them (2002)
Whatcha Want (2003)
Another Night in the Sun: Live in Helsinki (live album) (2010)
Sensory Overdrive (2011)
Horns and Halos (2013)
Blackout States (2015)
One Man Gang (2019)
I Live Too Fast to Die Young! (2022)

Singles 
"Keep It Up" (1987)
"Nights Are So Long" (1987)
"She's No Angel" (1987)
"Dead, Jail or Rock 'N' Roll (1989)
"She's No Angel" (1989)
"Not Fakin' It" (1989)
"Man With No Eyes" (1989)
"While You Were Looking At Me" (1990)
"Magic Carpet Ride" (Featuring Slash, 1990)
"Make It Go Away" (1996)
"Stranded" (2003)
"Superpowered Superfly" (2010)
"'78" (2011)
"Trick Of The Wrist" (2011)
"Ballad Of The Lower East Side" (2013)
"Eighteen Angels" (2013)
"Stained Glass Heart" (2013)
"Old King's Road" (2015)
"Goin' Down With The Ship" (2015)
"One Foot Outta The Grave" (2017)
"One Man Gang" (2019)
"Last Train To Tokyo" (2019)
"Murder The Summer Of Love" (2022)
"Can't Stop Falling Apart" (2022)
”Everybody’s Nobody” (2022)

Hanoi Rocks albums 
Bangkok Shocks, Saigon Shakes, Hanoi Rocks (1981)
Oriental Beat (1982)
Self Destruction Blues (1982)
Back to Mystery City (1983)
All Those Wasted Years (Live) (1983)
Two Steps from the Move (1984)
Rock & Roll Divorce (Live) (1985)
Twelve Shots on the Rocks (2002)
Another Hostile Takeover (2005)
Street Poetry (2007)

Jerusalem Slim albums
Jerusalem Slim (1992)

Demolition 23. albums
Demolition 23. (1994)

Guest appearances
 London Cowboys: Street Full of Soul (1983)
 Hook, Line and Sinker: Hook, Line and Sinker and Saigon (1983)
 Tall in the Saddle (1984)
 It Takes Time (1985)
 Artists United Against Apartheid: Sun City (1985)
 Que Sera Sera – Johnny Thunders album (1985)
 Long Time Coming (1986)
 Dance Crazy (1987)
 Guns N' Roses: Use Your Illusion I (1991)
 WOW! WOW! OUI! OUI! (1992)
 Chinese Rocks – Ultimate Thunders Live Collection (1993)
 Guns N' Roses: "The Spaghetti Incident?" (1993)
 Various artists: Coneheads: Music From The Motion Picture Soundtrack (1993)
 Warrior Soul: Chill Pill (1993)
 Johnny On Rocks featuring the whole Hanoi Rocks (1996)
 Dogtown Balladeers: A Tale Worth Hearing (1996)
 Countdown Love (1997)
 Backyard Babies: Total 13 (1998) on the bonus track 'Rocker'
 Kerma: Kerma plays Rolling Stones (1998)
 I Only Wrote This Song For You – A Tribute to Johnny Thunders (2003)
 White Flame: Swimsuit Issue Centerfold (single) (2007)
 Mikko Herranen: Kylmä Maailma (album) (2012)
 Tarja Turunen: "Your Heaven and Your Hell" (2016)
 Lordi: Killection (2020) on the track "Like a Bee to the Honey"
 Rock-Criminals: "Get Yourself Together" (2023)

Literature – books about Michael Monroe 
Michael Monroe [Hardcover], Ari Väntänen and Michael Monroe (2011)
All Those Wasted Years [Hardcover], Ari Väntänen, Andy McCoy and Michael Monroe (2010)
Sheriff McCoy: Outlaw Legend of Hanoi Rocks [Hardcover], Andy McCoy (English edition 2010)
1001 Albums You Must Hear Before You Die. Quintet Publishing Limited. Macdonald, Bruno; Harrington, Jim, Dimery, Robert. ed. (2006)
Sound of the Beast: The Complete Headbanging History of Heavy Metal. HarperCollins. Christe, Ian (2003)
Boulevard of Broken Dreams [Hardcover], 1987

References

External links 
 
 
 

1962 births
20th-century Finnish male singers
21st-century Finnish male singers
21st-century saxophonists
Finnish heavy metal singers
Finnish saxophonists
Male saxophonists
Hanoi Rocks members
Living people
Singers from Helsinki
Glam rock musicians
Finnish rock singers
Glam punk musicians
Finnish harmonica players